University of Sufism and Modern Sciences is a public university funded by the Government of Sindh in Bhit Shah, Sindh, Pakistan. It was founded in 2011 to promote education and research in Sufism and build Sufi studies as an academic subject in Sindh and to connect traditional education of Sufism with modern sciences. The University of Sufism and Modern Sciences (USMS) is situated in Bhitshah Town, Matiari District, home to a Shrine of the Sufi Saint HazratShah Abdul Latif Bhittai.

The Charter of the University of Sufism and Modern Sciences was approved on 21 November 2011 under letter No: PAS/Legis-B-21/2011 dated 21 November 2011 and was initially established as a campus of the University of Sindh, Jamshoro. The university later became an independent university and Parveen Munshi has been appointed as the first vice-chancellor of The University of Sufism and Modern Sciences, Bhitshah on 11 April 2016.

Academic departments
Department of Education and Sufism
Department of Computer Science
Department of Information Technology
Department of Business Administration
Department of Commerce

Administration
Vice-Chancellor Secratrate
Registrar Office
Controller of Examination
Directorate of Finance
Office of Research, Innovation, and Commercialization (ORIC)
Quality Enhancement Cell (QEC)
Directorate of IT Services]
Students Financial Aid Office
Directorate of Sports
Central Library
Center for Sufi Studies, Research, and Publications (CSSRP)

Research work
Dunyae Tassawuf (Urdu Research Journal)
Sufiani Sugandh (Sindhi research Journal)
Journal of Sufi Research and Practice

References

2011 establishments in Pakistan
Public universities and colleges in Sindh
Sufism in Sindh